Gerald "Jerry" Labriola (born May 17, 1931) is an American mystery writer, physician, and assistant professor at the University of Connecticut Medical School. In Connecticut's 1994 U.S. Senate election, he ran a losing campaign as the Republican nominee against Democrat Joe Lieberman. He has also run unsuccessfully for Governor of Connecticut and served in the Connecticut Senate.

References

External links
 Biography

Living people
Republican Party Connecticut state senators
21st-century American novelists
American male novelists
American mystery writers
Physicians from Connecticut
1931 births
American people of Italian descent
Republican National Committee members
21st-century American male writers